The 2005–06 Israeli Premier League season saw Maccabi Haifa win their third consecutive title. It took place from the first match on 26 August 2005 to the final match on 14 May 2006.

Two teams from Liga Leumit were promoted at the end of the previous season: Hapoel Kfar Saba and Maccabi Netanya. The two teams relegated were Hapoel Haifa and Hapoel Be'er Sheva.

Teams and Locations

Twelve teams took part in the 2005-06 Israeli Premier League season, including ten teams from the 2004-05 season, as well as two teams which were promoted from the 2004-05 Liga Leumit.

Hapoel Kfar Saba were promoted as champions of the 2004-05 Liga Leumit. Maccabi Netanya were promoted as runners up. Hapoel Kfar Saba and Maccabi Netanya returned to the top flight after an absence of two and one seasons respectively.

Hapoel Haifa and Hapoel Be'er Sheva were relegated after finishing in the bottom two places in the 2004-05 season.

Final table

Results

First and second round

Third round

Top goal scorers

See also
2005–06 Toto Cup Al

Israeli Premier League seasons
Israel
1